Jenny Griffiths is the founder and CEO of Snap Vision. She is a software engineer turned entrepreneur.

She has been featured on the Europe's and World's Top 50 Women in Tech 2018 by Forbes lists. She was appointed MBE for Services to Innovation in 2015, and in 2019 was awarded the Royal Academy of Engineering's Silver Medal for contributions to UK engineering.  She has also been selected in Drapers 30 Under 30 and Forbes European list in the "Consumer Technology" category 2016.

Education 
She graduated in Computer Science from the University of Bristol in 2009. Before graduating, she won the New Enterprise Competition at the university.

Career 
After graduating, she worked as a project manager at a cyber-security firm while working in parallel on developing Snap Vision, a visual search engine (a technology that teaches computer how to see), and later turned it into Snap Fashion, an app and a website. She kept on working as a project manager until 2012 when she quit to take her business, Snap Fashion, live.  Snap Fashion became Snap Vision when she started licensing the technology to other businesses beyond her original app and website.

Snap Vision is a visual search platform which licenses technologies to publishers and retailers to improve product discoverability make images shoppable.  They have licensed technology to the likes of Westfield and Time Inc, and recently won Oracle's marketing innovation award for their technology.

Her original application is also still live and growing.  Snap Fashion is an app and website that allows shoppers to find the clothes they like based on a picture, taken with a smartphone or from a magazine. The app searches for it, for matching outfit and compare prices from the database of retailers. In 2019, the database already counted with more than 110 retailers. On the other hand, the Snap Fashion InStore tool aimed at taking the visual search concept into the fitting rooms of High Street stores. The app would provide consumer advice regarding fashion, clothing and clothing accessories by asking a set of questions to someone trying clothes in the fitting room.

From graduation, 2009, until 2012, she struggled to find attention and funding. Although fashion magazines liked it, most male-centric tech publication did not show interest. Jenny said “Technology wise, it was hard to get noticed, probably because we are a female-based product”. It changed when she won BIG, the British Innovation Gateway Award, an annual contest organized by CISCO offering money prize and marketing, public relations and legal support in addition to a year mentorship.

In 2016, she was awarded a £1 million contract under Innovate UK's re-imagining the High Street' SBRI (Small Business Research Initiative) programme to create Snap InStore and raised £2 million in the company's Series A round of financing. Snap Fashion was Time Inc.’s first venture capital investment outside of the US, which is something Jenny Griffiths is very proud of.  She has since raised further rounds of finance to continue to grow the business.

The technology went on to win multiple awards or be in the final rounds of prestigious competitions such as

 Winner, Re-imagining the High St - SBRI & TSB Funding Competition, 2014
 Winner, UK Mobile & App Design Awards - SBRI & TSB Funding Competition, 2014
 Creative Entrepreneur of the Year 2013 - British Council & The Guardian, 2013
 23rd Most Influential Woman in UK IT 2013 - Computer Weekly, 2013
 Winner - Young Guns 5 to Watch - Young Guns / Growing Business, 2013
 Future 50 Entrepreneur - Ernst&Young
 Winner - Cisco British Innovation Gateway Awards - Cisco, 2012
 Winner - Decoded Fashion, 2012 - Decoded Fashion
 Winner - Future 50 Competition - Red Bull and Real Business Magazine, 2011
 Winner - Tech City Launchpad Competition - Technology Strategy Board, 2011
 Winner - New Enterprise Competition - University of Bristol, 2009

Jenny Griffiths has been called an ambassador for women in tech and she truly thinks women who want to go into the tech industry, or just young people hoping to set up a business, need to see successful entrepreneurs who can also speak honestly about what it takes to set up a business.

She renamed her company from Snap Fashion to SnapTech in 2016, and to Snap Vision in 2020, and currently offers 9 different products.

Awards 
 2009: MBE for services to digital innovation in the fashion industry.
2012: Cisco British Innovation Award
 2014: British Council's Creative Entrepreneur of the Year.
 2015: MBE for Services to Innovation in the Digital Fashion Industry
2019: Royal Academy of Engineering Silver Medal

References

External links 
 Website for Snap Fashion
Website for Snap Vision

Living people
Year of birth missing (living people)